Daisy Schjelderup (16 June 1916 – 16 October 1991) was a Norwegian translator and writer.

Biography 
She grew up in Oslo. During the German occupation of Norway she was for a time incarcerated in Grini concentration camp, from September to October 1941.

She made her literary debut in 1976 with the poetry collection Torneroses etterlatte papirer, following in with the short-story collection Sangen om Landegode. In her later years she made a mark as a peace activist and issued the pamphlet Grasbrann. Brev til et menneske on Gyldendal in 1980. As a translator she issued, among others: Herman Melville's Moby Dick, Virginia Woolf's A Room of One’s Own, Mario Puzo's The Godfather, Emily Brontë's Wuthering Heights, and Roald Dahl's Kiss Kiss.
 
She was married to engineer Gunnar Monsen (1916–1982); as a widow she relocated from Aukra to Folldal and represented the Labour Party in Folldal municipal council, until 1989 when she stepped down due to health issues. She died in 1991 in Folldal.

References

1916 births
1991 deaths
Writers from Oslo
Grini concentration camp survivors
Translators from English
Norwegian poets
Norwegian women writers
Norwegian women activists
Labour Party (Norway) politicians
Hedmark politicians
People from Folldal
Norwegian women in politics
20th-century Norwegian translators